Shu Tong (November 25, 1905 – May 27, 1998) was a People's Republic of China politician. He was born in Dongxiang County, Jiangxi Province (part of Fuzhou, Jiangxi Province). He joined the Chinese Communist Party in 1926. He was Chinese Communist Party Committee Secretary of Shandong Province. He died in Beijing.

Shu Tong was also reputed for his calligraphy.

1905 births
1998 deaths
People's Republic of China politicians from Jiangxi
Chinese Communist Party politicians from Jiangxi
Politicians from Fuzhou, Jiangxi
Political office-holders in Shandong
Victims of the Cultural Revolution
People's Republic of China calligraphers
Artists from Jiangxi
Burials at Babaoshan Revolutionary Cemetery